was a village located in Tosa District, Kōchi Prefecture, Japan.

As of 2003, the village had an estimated population of 1,251 and a density of 21.12 persons per km2. The total area was 59.22 km2.

On January 1, 2005, Tosayama, along with the village of Kagami (also from Tosa District), was merged into the expanded city of Kōchi, and thus no longer exists as an independent municipality.

External links
 Official website of the city of Kochi  

Dissolved municipalities of Kōchi Prefecture
Kōchi